Davide Salvado is a Galician Traditional music and World music singer from Galicia, Spain.
He performed at World Music Expo 2014 in trio with accordionist Santi Cribeiro and Cristian Silva on pipes and percussion.

Biography

Discography 
 Árnica Pura (2011)

 Lobos (2015)

See also 
 Music of Galicia, Cantabria and Asturias

References

External links 
 Davide Salvado on facebook
 Davide Salvado on Last.fm

Musicians from Galicia (Spain)
World music singers
World music percussionists
Spanish folk musicians
Living people
1981 births
People from Marín, Pontevedra